The Broome Sandstone, formerly known as the Broome Beds, is an Early Cretaceous geologic formation found in Western Australia, and formerly considered part of Dampier Group. Fossil sauropod tracks, belonging to an unknown ichnotaxon, and stegosaur tracks belonging to the ichnogenus and species Garbina roeorum have been reported from the formation.

See also 
 List of dinosaur-bearing rock formations
 List of stratigraphic units with ornithischian tracks
 Stegosaur tracks

References

Bibliography

Further reading 
 S. W. Salisbury, A. Romilio, M. C. Herne, R. T. Tucker, and J. P. Nair. 2016. The Dinosaurian Ichnofauna of the Lower Cretaceous (Valanginian–Barremian) Broome Sandstone of the Walmadany Area (James Price Point), Dampier Peninsula, Western Australia. Society of Vertebrate Paleontology Memoir 16. Journal of Vertebrate Paleontology 36(6, suppl.):1-152

Geologic formations of Australia
Cretaceous System of Australia
Early Cretaceous Australia
Barremian Stage
Valanginian Stage
Sandstone formations
Deltaic deposits
Lagoonal deposits
Ichnofossiliferous formations
Fossiliferous stratigraphic units of Oceania
Paleontology in Australia
Geology of Western Australia
Kimberley (Western Australia)